Yvonne Keeley (born Yvonne Paaij, 6 September 1952) is a Dutch pop music singer. She is the sister of Patricia Paay.

She began her career as a session singer in the music industry in London. She was the girlfriend of Steve Harley of Steve Harley & Cockney Rebel, and sang on the 1975 hit, "Make Me Smile (Come Up and See Me)".  She also worked with Madeline Bell and Vicki Brown.

Most notably she performed as a duet with Scott Fitzgerald on the song "If I Had Words", which reached number 3 in the UK Singles Chart and Australia in 1978. It was also a hit in Ireland, New Zealand, Belgium, the Netherlands and Scandinavia and sold more than a million copies.

Keeley was part of the group the Star Sisters which was popular in the Netherlands during the 1980s. She also worked as radio presenter at the Dutch regional broadcaster Radio Rijnmond.

References

1952 births
Living people
Dutch women singers
Musicians from Rotterdam